Menahem Shemuel Halevy (lived 1884-1940 ) was a prominent Iranian Rabbi of the early 20th century.  He fought against persecution in Iran and wrote numerous books.

Halevy served the Jewish Congregation of Hamadan, first in Iran and later in Jerusalem, as a Rabbi, a Judge and an educator. While in Hamadan, he held the position of a teacher in the Alliance Israélite Universelle, and later as its principal. Moreover, he was the Jewish congregation's civil leader and representative to the Municipality of Hamadan. As the spiritual shepherd of his people, he insisted on teaching everyone the Hebrew language, the respect of the Torah and the love of the homeland, Zion. Being a gifted writer, he published poetry books, essays and historical books, both in Hebrew and Persian, of the Jews of Iran in general and of Hamadan in particular.

Activism in Iran
Halevy fought for the rights of the Jews of Hamadan, and his influence reached high places in government; thus, saving many of his brethren from imprisonment, torture and even death. Being simultaneously a pragmatist and an idealist, he believed that his participation as a representative to the Municipality of Hamadan would assure the Jews some security from arbitrary persecution at the hands of the Shiites, and in spite of his young age he headed the Jewish congregation.

Moreover, Halevy was committed to finding people who had left Judaism, and return them to the Jewish faith. He fought zealously against Jewish assimilation and conversion to Islam and to the Baháʼí Faith, which was popular at this time. Under his influence many converts, mainly from Mashhad, returned to Judaism. For that he was recognized by the Alliance Israélite Universelle in Paris. He dedicated all his efforts for this purpose, writing pamphlets, giving sermons, Sabbath after Sabbath, in the synagogue, and establishing various societies with the purpose of saving and returning the lost souls from their forced conversion back to Judaism.

Through his speeches and poetry Halevy implanted in the heart of his listeners the love for the land of their forefathers. His zeal and love of Zion echoed in his weekly sermons and motivated many Iranian Jews to return and settle in Israel. He was known by Jews from all over Persia as a phenomenal religious orator and as a Zionist leader, protecting the civil rights of the Jews. His charisma and oratorical power to move crowds to tears and to belief in the Jewish religion and the Zionist principles became legendary. He was notorious for his passionate speeches and he mesmerized the crowd with his words and stamina to tears.

Life in Israel
As soon as he arrived in Israel he was deemed to be one of the leaders of the Iranian congregation. He led the Iranian congregation and was a leading member of Vaad HaSephardim, and the Histadrut Haluzei HaMizrachi of Jerusalem. A year and a half after arriving in Israel, in 1924, the Vaad Haleumi of the Jews of Eretz Israel, appoints him as a judge in the Hebrew Courts. His talent of persuasion influenced many organizations to seek his help in raising money and souls for Israel. He is sent as an emissary by Keren Hayesod and HaMizrachi to Aden (Yemen), Aram Naharyim (Mesopotamia), Beirut, Sidon (Lebanon), Damascus, Egypt, and India, where he meets with Mahatma Gandhi trying to persuade him of the right of survival of the State of Israel in the Holy Land. Wherever he went he received written praise for persuading the Jews to return to the Holy Land and to contribute for the cause of Israel.

The Mizrachi Organization World Central on February 3, 1939 sent Rabbi Menahem their gratitude for establishing a Mizrachi branch in Bombay. They also acknowledge the importance of his meeting with Gandhi, and express the hope that the meeting with Rabbi Menahem might have opened Gandhi's eyes and change his negative attitude about Israel and the Jews.

In his poems Rabbi Menahem expresses his deepest love for Zion. His love for Zion was political, nationalistic and religious. It's the Promised Land from where the people of Israel were exiled and to where they were promised to return.

The trip to India negatively affected his health, and upon return, exhausted and worn out, he became ill. He died in 1940 at the age of 54.

Works
Mordecai VeEsther in Shushan HaBirah (1932), describing the grave site of Mordecai and Esther and narrating traditions and legends of the Iranian community, in Hebrew, (1932).
Zemirot Israel (Hymns of Israel), in Hebrew and Persian (Hamadan, Iran: Branch of the Zionist Union in Iran, 1921).
“Shivat Zion” and “Shir HaGueula”, poems written in honor of the 35 anniversary of the Mizrachi.
"Tafsir Mi Kamocha", a commentary in Persian about Yehuda Halevi’s poem, followed by a poem about Hadassa/Esther, bilingually, Hebrew/Persian (1924).

Manuscripts
“History of the Jews in Iran since the signing of the Talmud until today”.
“Mizan El Hak, Criticism of the Baháʼí religion, in Arabic.”
“Zeh Yenachameinu, about the Humash.”
“Kutnot Or, about the Mishna.”
“Commentaries to Halacha and Hagada.”
“Compilation of Shushan, on religious sites in Iran.”
“Translation of Hovat HaLevavot, in Persian.”
 Les Souvenirs de mon Enfance, in French, about ancient places in Iran.
“Ideology about the books of Saadi Hafit Amar-Hyiam and Megalsi.”
Amkam El Mukdsa Religious Sites, in Arabic.

References, sources and bibliography
Afary, Janet. “From Outcasts to Citizens: Jews in Qajar Iran” Esther's Children: A Portrait of Iranian Jews. ed. Houman Sarshar (Philadelphia: The Jewish Publication Society, 2002): 139–192.
Brauer, Dr. A. I. “Moreh Shelo Shavat: Leftirat Hamoreh Harav Menahem Shmuel Halevy Z”L [A teacher who did not rest: Menahem Shmuel Halevy, Blessed memory, deceased]”. HaAretz (February 6, 1940).
Ben Hanania, Yehoshua. “Matzav Yehudei Paras Lifnai Yovel Shanim [The Situation of the Iranian Jews, Fifty Years Ago]”. Mahberet, IV (Elul, 5715, 1955):141.
Cohen, Mordechai ed. Perakim BeToldot Yehudei HaMizrach, vol. V [Chapters in the History of the Oriental Jews] (Jerusalem: Misrad HaChinuch VehaTarbut, 1981): 262-265 (In Hebrew).
Eleventh Annual Report of the Anglo-Jewish Association in connection with the Alliance Israélite Universelle (London: 1881–1882, 5641–5642): 32–33.
Encyclopædia Iranica, Ehsan Yarshater, ed., Vol. XI, fascicle 6 (New York: Biblioteca Persica Press, 2003): 617.
Encyclopaedia Judaica, Vol. 7: 1220.
Gaon, Moshe David. Yehudei HaMizrach BeEretz Israel. vol. 2 [The Eastern Jews in the Land of Israel] (Jerusalem: Dfus Azriel, 1937): 334–335.
“Hamadan”, Encyclopaedia Judaica, vol. 7 (Jerusalem: Keter Publishing House, 1972): 1219–1220.
“Iran,” Encyclopaedia Judaica, vol. 8, 1442.
Kashani, Reuben. Yehudei Paras, Buchara Ve Afghanistan [The Jews of Iran, Bukhara and Afghanistan]. (Jerusalem: Kashani Publishing, 2001): 42.
Kashani, Reuben. “HaMatif VeHamekonen HaGadol [The Great Preacher and Mourner]”. Yom Shishi (23 Tamuz, 5748, 8 July 1988): 15.
Kashani, Reuben. “Aliat Yehudei Paras LeEretz Israel” [Immigration of the Persian Jews to The Land of Israel], BaMaaracha, no.229 (January, 1980): 11.
Kashani, Reuben. Kehilot HaYehudim BeParas [The Jewish Congregation in Iran]. (Jerusalem: Kashani Publishing, 1980): 11, 24 (In Hebrew).
Kramer-Hellinx, Nechama. “Envoy of the Sephardim: Rabbi Menachem Shmuel Halevy: Zionist, Peacemaker, Poet, 1884-1940.” International Sephardic Journal (Spring 2005/ 5765 Vol. 2 No. 1), 213–226.
Kramer-Hellinx, Nechama. “The Genealogy of Rabbi Menahem Shemuel Halevy of Hamadan (Iran) [Part I]”. Etsi: Revue de Généalogie et d´Histoire Séfarades, No. 30 (Septembre 2005, Volume 8), 9-18.
Kramer-Hellinx, Nechama. “Life and Contribution for the Cause of Zion of Rabbi Menahem Shemuel Halevy of Hamadan (Iran), [Part II]”. Etsi: Revue de Généalogie et d´Histoire Séfarades, No. 32 (March 2006, Volume 9), 3–9.
Kramer-Hellinx, Nechama. “Rabbi Menahem Shemuel Halevy’s Poetry, [Part III] “. Etsi: Revue de Généalogie et d´Histoire Séfarades, No. 34 (Septembre 2006, Volume 9,), 6–9.
Kramer-Hellinx, Nechama. “From Hamadan, Iran to Zion: From Bondage to Freedom, The Life Journey of the Zionist Rabbi Menahem Shemuel Halevy (1884-1940)”. The Queens College Journal of Jewish Studies (spring 2006, Volume VIII).
Kramer-Hellinx, Nechama. “Rabbi Menahem Shemuel Halevy: From Hamadan, Persia to Jerusalem”.  Iran, Bukhara, Afghanistan, ABA (winter 2012, Vol. 6 (115-154)].
Kramer-Hellinx, Nechama. “Genealogy: Rabbi Menahem Shemuel Halevy (1884-1940)”, Proceedings of the 32nd IAJGS, International Conference of Jewish Genealogy, Volume 3, Sephardic, Middle –East and African Areas (Paris, France: July 15–18, 2012),359-390
Levy, Azaria. “Yehudei Paras BeYerushalyim [The Jews of Persia in Jerusalem]”. Kivunim, 27 (Jerusalem, 1985): 140.
Misrahi, Hanina. The History of the Persian Jews and Their Poets (Jerusalem: Rubin Mass, 1966): 35–50.
Misrachi, Hanina. “HaRav Menahem Levy, Z”L [blessed memory]”. Hed HaChinuch, 6-7 (Shevat 22, 5700 [1940]: 144.
Netzer, Amnon. Yehudei Iran, [The Jews of Iran]. (Holon: Beit Koresh, 1988): 66-67 (In Hebrew).
Pozailov, Giora. Chachmeihem Shel Yehudei Iran VeAfghanistan [The Wisemen of Iran and Afghanistan] (Jerusalem, Sifriat Hamoreh Hadati, 1995): 123-134 (In Hebrew).
Sarshar, Houman ed. “Introduction”, Esther's Children: A Portrait of Iranian Jews (Philadelphia: The Jewish Publication Society, 2002): xix-xx (The book covers the history of the Iranian Jews, in general, and gives detailed information, region by region);
The Tenth Annual Report of the Anglo-Jewish Association in Connection with the Alliance Israélite Universelle (1880–81): 38–39.
The Twenty-Second Annual Report of the Anglo-Jewish Association in connection with the Alliance Israélite Universelle (London: 1892–1893, 5652–5653): 19–23.
The Twenty-Third Annual Report of the Anglo-Jewish Association in connection with the Alliance Israélite Universelle (London: 1893–1894, 5653–5654): 17–18.

1884 births
1940 deaths
Iranian rabbis
Iranian Jews
Iranian religious leaders
Iranian emigrants to Israel
Israeli Orthodox rabbis
Burials at the Jewish cemetery on the Mount of Olives